Clipping may refer to:

Words

 Clipping (morphology), the formation of a new word by shortening it, e.g. "ad" from "advertisement"
 Clipping (phonetics), shortening the articulation of a speech sound, usually a vowel
 Clipping (publications), the cutting-out of articles from a paper publication

Science and technology

 Coin clipping, shaving off a small portion of precious metal for profit
 Clipping (computer graphics), only drawing things that will be visible to the viewer
 Noclip mode, or "Noclipping", when the player or another object in a video game unrealistically passes through another object
 Clipping (gardening), pruning, removing unwanted portions from a plant
 Clipping (medicine), surgical treatment used to treat an aneurysm
 Clipping (signal processing), a form of distortion that limits a signal once it exceeds a threshold. Some forms include:
 Clipping (audio), the clipping of the top and bottom of a sound wave, referred to as "distortion" or "overdrive"
 Clipping (photography), the clipping of overexposed area by digital cameras and film
 Soft clipping

Animals

 Horse clipping, trimming all or part of a horse's fur horse short
 Sheep shearing
 Wing clipping, trimming a bird's primary flight feathers to disable flight

Sports

 Clipping (climbing), the process of protecting against a fall
 Clipping (gridiron football), a penalty in gridiron football
 Clipping (ice hockey), hitting an opposing player below the knees

Other uses

 Clipping the church, an ancient custom
 Clipping (band), an experimental hip-hop group
 CLPPNG, their debut album

See also
 Clip (disambiguation)